Rho GTPase-activating protein 24 is an enzyme that in humans is encoded by the ARHGAP24 gene.

References

External links

Further reading